Northcentral Technical College (NTC) is a public community college in Wausau, Wisconsin. It is a member of the Wisconsin Technical College System. The district of the college includes all of, or portions of, Marathon, Lincoln, Taylor, Price, Langlade, Menominee, Clark, Portage, Shawano and Waupaca counties. The main campus is located in Wausau. There are regional centers in Antigo, Medford, Merrill, Phillips, Spencer and Wittenberg.

Accreditation
Northcentral Technical College is accredited by the Higher Learning Commission of the North Central Association (NCA). Several programs are accredited by other accreditation bodies.

History
The college began as Wausau Industrial School in 1912. It was renamed Wausau Vocational School in 1936, Wausau Technical Institute in 1961, North Central Technical Institute (NCTI) in 1967. It began occupying its new facility in 1969. It was renamed Northcentral Technical College in 1988.

Academics

NTC offers associate degrees, technical diplomas, and over 100 certificate programs in agriculture, business, community services, general studies, health, public safety and technical and trades.

Notable alumni
Russ Decker, politician

References

External links

Official website

Wisconsin technical colleges
Wausau, Wisconsin
Educational institutions established in 1912
Education in Marathon County, Wisconsin
Education in Langlade County, Wisconsin
Education in Taylor County, Wisconsin
Education in Price County, Wisconsin
Education in Shawano County, Wisconsin
1912 establishments in Wisconsin